Last Dragon is the third solo studio album by American R&B recording artist Sisqó of Dru Hill. The album was released on February 10, 2015, via Massenburg Media and Dragon Music. In 2012, during a performance in Doha, Sisqó announced he was working on his third album. On December 10, Sisqó announced on his Twitter account that those who pre-order Last Dragon will be entitled to an instant download of the track "Round & Round". Sisqó expressed an interest in working with R. Kelly on the album

Track listing

References

Sisqó albums
2015 albums